Fixed pixel displays are display technologies such as LCD and plasma that use an unfluctuating matrix of pixels with a set number of pixels in each row and column. With such displays, adjusting (scaling) to different aspect ratios because of different input signals requires complex processing.

In contrast, the CRTs electronics architecture "paints" the screen with the required number of pixels horizontally and vertically. CRTs can be designed to more easily accommodate a wide range of inputs (VGA, XVGA, NTSC, HDTV, etc.).

References 

Digital imaging